Alexandre-Denis-Abel de Pujol or Abel de Pujol (30 January 1785 in Valenciennes – 29 September 1861 in Paris) was a French painter. He was a student of David and his own students included Alexandre-Gabriel Decamps and Emile Levy. He painted the ceiling of the grand-staircase at the Louvre as well as the galerie de Diane at Fontainebleau and the ceiling of the Bourse de Paris. A member of the Institut de France, he was an officer of the légion d'honneur.

Selected works

Students 
 Julien Hudson, (1811–1844)
 François Debon, (1816–1872)
 Adrienne Marie Louise Grandpierre-Deverzy, (1798–1869) who married him
 Auguste Désiré Saint-Quentin, (1833–1906)
 Alexandre-Gabriel Decamps, (1803–1860)
 Alphonse Lami, (1822-1867)

Bibliography 
Théodore Pelloquet Dictionnaire de poche des artistes contemporains Paris 1858
Georges Rouget Notice sur Abel de Pujol, peintre d'histoire, membre de l'Institut typ. de E. Prignet Paris 1861 on Googlebooks

External links

  Analysis of the work 'Workshop of Abel de Pujol' by Adrienne Marie Louise Grandpierre-Deverzy
Abel de Pujol @ ArtCyclopedia

1787 births
1861 deaths
18th-century French painters
French male painters
19th-century French painters
Officiers of the Légion d'honneur
People from Valenciennes
19th-century French male artists
18th-century French male artists